Zvenigora is a 1928 Soviet silent film by Ukrainian director Alexander Dovzhenko, first shown on 13 April 1928. This was the fourth film by Dovzhenko, but the first one which was widely reviewed and discussed in the media. This was also the last film by Dovzhenko for which he was not the sole scriptwriter.

Cast 
 Georgi Astafyev as Scythian leader (as G. Astafyev)
 Nikolai Nademsky as Grandpa / General
 Vladimir Uralsky as Peasant
 Aleksandr Podorozhny as Pavlo - second grandson (as Les Podorozhnij)
 Semyon Svashenko as Timoshka - first grandson
 I. Selyuk as Ataman
 L. Barné as Monk
 L. Parshina as Timoshka's wife
 P. Sklyar Otawa as Okasana — Mountain Princess
 A. Simonov as Cossack Officer

Production
The script was originally written by Maike "Mike" Johansen and Yurtyk (Yuri Tiutiunnyk), but eventually Dovzhenko heavily rewrote the script himself and removed Johansen and Tyutyunnyk's names from the screenplay and did not include them in the film credits.
Pavlo Nechesa, head of the Odessa film studio VUFKU recalls: ″We were discussing the screenplay for Zvenigora … Almost everyone was against the script … Dovzhenko said ″I’ll take and make …″. As a project, Zvenigora got its start in June 1927.

Content
Regarded as a silent revolutionary epic, Dovzhenko's initial film in his Ukraine Trilogy (along with Arsenal and Earth) is almost religious in tone, relating a millennium of Ukrainian history through the story of an old man who tells his grandson about a treasure buried in a mountain. The film mixes fiction and reality. Although Dovzhenko referred to Zvenigora as his "party membership card", the relationship between the individual and nature is the main theme of the film, which is highly atypical of the Soviet cinema of the end of the 1920s and its avant-garde influences. Dovzhenko states that full submission to nature made humanity powerless in the face of nature, and understanding and control of nature is required to make progress. For him, the October Revolution brought about such an understanding.

Reception
At the time of release, the film was widely reviewed in the press but generally regarded as not conforming with Soviet aesthetics. In 1927, even before the film's release, the newspaper Kino (Cinema) sharply criticized the screenplay, calling it "bourgeois" and "nationalistic".

In the 2012, Sight & Sound Director's Poll of the Greatest Films of All Time, Guy Maddin placed it on his top ten list, describing the film as "mind-bogglingly eccentric!"

References

Bibliography 
 Histoire du cinéma ukrainien (1896–1995), Lubomir Hosejko, Éditions à Dié, Dié, 2001, traduit en ukrainien en 2005 : Istoria Oukraïnskovo Kinemotografa, Kino-Kolo, Kiev, 2005,

External links
 Zvenigora, Odessa Film Studios

Ray Uzwyshyn Zvenyhora: Ethnographic Modernism

1928 drama films
1928 films
Soviet black-and-white films
Films directed by Alexander Dovzhenko
Russian Civil War films
Films set in Ukraine
Odesa Film Studio
Soviet silent feature films
Soviet-era Ukrainian films
All-Ukrainian Photo Cinema Administration films
Ukrainian black-and-white films
Ukrainian silent feature films
Soviet drama films
Ukrainian drama films
Silent drama films